The montane widowbird (Euplectes psammacromius), also known as the mountain marsh widowbird is a species of bird in the family Ploceidae, which is native to the eastern Afrotropics.

Range and habitat
It is an endemic resident of the eastern Afromontane grasslands. It occurs in northeast Zambia, northern Malawi and the highlands of southwestern Tanzania.

Description
Like all widowbirds the male and female plumages differ prominently during breeding season. In the breeding season males moult into a black breeding plumage, which includes long tail feathers and yellow shoulder patches (these patches retain a discrete appearance during the non-breeding period). Outside the breeding season the sexes are similar in appearance, both having speckled brown and black plumage.

Behaviour
During this period males defend territories in the early morning after sunrise and in the evening before sunset.

References

 BirdLife International 2004.  Euplectes psammocromius.   2006 IUCN Red List of Threatened Species.   Downloaded on 25 July 2007.
 Birds of East Africa. Terry Stevenson, John Fanshawe. 2002.
 Degree project data. 2010. David Krantz. Biology student, Department of Zoology, University of Gothenburg.

montane widowbird
Birds of East Africa
montane widowbird
Taxonomy articles created by Polbot